"I'm Yours" is 1961 song recorded by Elvis Presley which appeared on the Pot Luck with Elvis album. The recording was released as a single in 1965. It was written by Don Robertson and Hal Blair.

Background
The song was recorded by Elvis Presley on June 26, 1961, at RCA's Nashville studios, and released on the album, Pot Luck with Elvis, on June 5, 1962. It was published by Elvis Presley's publishing company Gladys Music, Inc. The single was also released in Canada, France, and New Zealand. The single was certified Gold in the U.S. by the RIAA in March, 1992.

It was not released as a single until three years later when it was featured in Presley's film Tickle Me (1965). "I'm Yours" peaked at number 11 on the U.S. Billboard Hot 100 in October 1965.  "I'm Yours" reached the top of the Billboard Easy Listening chart to become Presley's third consecutive number-one single on the chart.

Weekly charts

See also
List of number-one adult contemporary singles of 1965 (U.S.)

References

1961 songs
1965 singles
Elvis Presley songs
Songs written by Don Robertson (songwriter)
Songs written by Hal Blair